Kiyohara Nayu (清原 奈侑, Kiyohara Nayu) is a Japanese softball player who plays as a catcher. She represented Japan at the 2020 Summer Olympics and won a gold medal.

References 

Japanese softball players
Living people
Olympic softball players of Japan
Softball players at the 2020 Summer Olympics
1991 births
Olympic gold medalists for Japan
Olympic medalists in softball
Medalists at the 2020 Summer Olympics
21st-century Japanese women